Korindo (also called Mirokubosatsu Korindo) is a Raëlian temple in Tako near Narita, Japan. It is the first such temple dedicated to the Elohim, and meditation.

Korindo is a Japanese word that means "light coming from the sky". It is the first recognised Raëlian temple for about 1500 active members and promoters of this UFO religion, mentors, and over 50.000 followers of Raëlism from about 84 countries, and is situated in a village near Narita in Japan. In Asia, Japan dominates in proportion of the people who have faith in Raëlism. It is believed by the Raëlians that life on Earth was created by extraterrestrial scientists from space, in their own image and resemblance. Moreover, Raëlians further claim that it was a Sunday when Adam and Eve were brought into being by the Elohim.

Inauguration
The temple was inaugurated on October 7, 2010 in commemoration of the 35th anniversary of the second meeting of Raël with the Elohim. Raël also claims to have visited the Elohims' planet at that time. Many Raëlians, and over 100 mentors attended the inauguration of the Korindo, which coincided with a two-day seminar for the Raëlians.

See also
 Raëlism
 Raëlian beliefs and practices
 Ancient astronauts

References

External links
Official Website of the Raëlian Movement
Official News and Views of the Raëlian Movement
Who are the Raëlians? David Chazan, BBC News 2002.

Religious buildings and structures completed in 2010
Raëlism
Temples in Japan